Pavel is a village in Polski Trambesh Municipality, Veliko Tarnovo Province, Bulgaria. Its current population is 874.. The current mayor of the village is Anka Pencheva Licheva.

References

External links
Official Website of Pavel

Villages in Veliko Tarnovo Province